The 2019–20 season was Al-Shabab's 43rd non-consecutive season in the top flight of Saudi football and 73rd year in existence as a football club. This season Al-Shabab participated in the Pro League, the King Cup, and the Arab Club Champions Cup. 

The season covers the period from 1 July 2019 to 20 September 2020.

Players

Squad information

Out on loan

Transfers and loans

Transfers in

Loans in

Transfers out

Loans out

Competitions

Overview

Goalscorers

Last Updated: 9 September 2020

Assists

Last Updated: 9 September 2020

Clean sheets

Last Updated: 9 September 2020

References

Al Shabab FC (Riyadh) seasons
Shabab